Alfredo Rodrigues Gaspar (8 December 1865 in Funchal – 1 December 1938 in Lisbon) was a Portuguese military officer and politician. Rodrigues Gaspar was President of the Ministry (Prime Minister) of one of the many governments of the Portuguese First Republic.

Biography 
He was born on 8 August 1865 in the Penha de França neighbourhood, in what is today's freguesia of Sé, in Funchal, to Manuel Rodrigues Gaspar, a carpenter and Maria Augusta.

He was President of the Council of Ministers (Prime-Minister) in one of the First Portuguese Republic's many governments, between 6 July 1924 and 22 November 1924. He was also Minister of Agriculture between 6 and 22 July 1924.

The political instability of the First Republic would make him take the positions of Minister of Education, Minister of the Colonies and last President of the Chamber of Deputies. He was also teacher at the Naval School.

At the time of his death, on 30 November 1938, he was director of the Navy's Explosives Laboratory and president of the Technical Commission of Naval Artillery, holding the post retired Captain.

He was married to Carolina Maria Saavedre, sister of Tomás Óscar Pinto da Cunha Saavedra, Baron of Saavedra.

Honours

National orders 

  Commander of the Order of Aviz, (11 March 1919)
  Grad-Officer of the Order of Aviz (19 October 1920)
  Grand-Cross of the Order of Christ (24 June 1932)

References 

1865 births
1938 deaths
Naval ministers of Portugal
Prime Ministers of Portugal
Presidents of the Chamber of Deputies of Portugal (1910–1926)
Agriculture ministers of Portugal
Mayors of Lisbon
Portuguese military personnel
People from Funchal